Kedrostis is a genus of ± 35 species climbing or trailing herbs in the family Cucurbitaceae. Its native range is tropical Africa and Asia.

Species 
 Kedrostis abdallai A. Zimmermann 
 Kedrostis africana (L.) Cogn. 
 Kedrostis bennettii (Miq.) W.J.de Wilde & Duyfjes 
 Kedrostis capensis (Sond.) A. Meeuse  
 Kedrostis cogniauxii Keraudr. 
 Kedrostis courtallensis (Arn.) C. Jeffrey 
 Kedrostis crassirostrata Bremek. 
 Kedrostis dissecta Keraudr.  
 Kedrostis elongata Keraudr.  
 Kedrostis foetidissima (Jacq.) Cogn. 
 Kedrostis heterophylla Zimmermann  
 Kedrostis hirta W.J.de Wilde & Duyfjes  
 Kedrostis hirtella (Naud.) Cogn.  
 Kedrostis lanuginosa Keraudr. 
 Kedrostis laxa Keraudr. 
 Kedrostis leloja (Forssk. ex J.F.Gmel.) C. Jeffrey  
 Kedrostis limpompensis C. Jeffrey 
 Kedrostis monosperma W.J.de Wilde & Duyfjes 
 Kedrostis nana (Lam.) Cogn. 
 Kedrostis nana var. schlechteri (Cogn.) A. Meeuse 
 Kedrostis nana var. zeyheri (Schrad.) A. Meeuse 
 Kedrostis perrieri Keraudr. 
 Kedrostis psammophila P. Bruyns  
 Kedrostis pseudogijef (Gilg) C. Jeffrey

References

Cucurbitoideae
Cucurbitaceae genera